Lost Creek State Park is a state park in northeastern Morgan County, Utah, United States, about  northeast of city of Henefer and about  northeast of the unincorporated community of Croydon, Utah.

Description
The park is located at the Lost Creek Reservoir and is currently under development. It is anticipate to include "modern campgrounds, restrooms, entrance, and trailheads". , "all areas of this park remain in an extremely primitive state". However, there are vault toilets at several locations and a concrete boat ramp on the south side of the Trail Creek/Francis Canyon (southern) arm of the reservoir. One anticipated change to the area is that hunting will be limited to waterfowl.

Access to the park is by way of Utah State Route 158 (via Exit 111 on Interstate 80), then by either North 5800 East or North 6900 East, in or near Croydon. (The former street becomes Lost Creek Road and the north end of the later street is at Lost Creek Road.) Lost Creek Road is asphalt paved past the Lost Creek Dam.

History
Legislation in March 2021 created the park (as well as the Utahraptor State Park in Grand County). However, it appears that years prior to the establishment of the current park, there existed either a former Lost Creek State Park (at the same reservoir) or there were well developed plans for the same, since the Lost Creek State Park appeared on United States Geological Survey (USGS) maps as early as 1991. In addition, the USGS's Geographic Names Information System included the park (with an alternate name of Lost Creek Lake State Beach) by not later than June 1, 2018.

See also

 List of Utah State Parks

References

External links

 

State parks of Utah
Protected areas of Grand County, Utah
Protected areas established in 2021
Provincial and state parks in the Rocky Mountains